This article describes a 2001 album in the U.S. Now! series. It should not be confused with other similarly titled "Now!" Christmas albums. For more information, see Now That's What I Call Music! and Now That's What I Call Music! discography

Now That's What I Call Christmas! is a two-disc holiday music compilation that was released on October 23, 2001, by Universal Music Group. The album is part of the (U.S.) Now! series, and the first holiday-themed album in the series.

On November 15, 2004, Now That's What I Call Christmas! was certified 6× Platinum by the Recording Industry Association of America for shipment of six million units in the United States.

Based on sales figures provided by Nielsen SoundScan, the album was also the best-selling Christmas/holiday album in the U.S. for both 2001 and 2002 with sales of 1,614,000 and 741,000 copies respectively. As of November 2014, Now That's What I Call Christmas! is the eighth best-selling Christmas/holiday album in the U.S. during the SoundScan era of music sales tracking (March 1991 — present), having sold 3,480,000 copies.

Track listing

Disc one

Disc Two

Charts and sales
2001 Billboard 200 – No. 3
2001 Top Internet Albums – No. 4
RIAA certification: 6× Platinum (US)

See also
 List of Billboard Top Holiday Albums number ones of the 2000s

References

External links
 Now That's What I Call Christmas! front- and backcover
 Now That's What I Call Christmas! TV advert

Now That's What I Call Music! Christmas albums
2001 compilation albums
2001 Christmas albums
Christmas 01